Statler Fountain is a 1930 fountain designed by Ulysses Anthony Ricci, installed in Boston's Statler Park, in the U.S. state of Massachusetts. The Art Deco fountain features a bronze statue of a woman. It was surveyed as part of the Smithsonian Institution's "Save Outdoor Sculpture!" program in 1993.

See also

 1930 in art

References

1930 establishments in Massachusetts
1930 sculptures
Art Deco architecture in Massachusetts
Art Deco sculptures and memorials
Bronze sculptures in Massachusetts
Concrete sculptures in Massachusetts
Fountains in Massachusetts
Granite sculptures in Massachusetts
Outdoor sculptures in Boston
Sculptures of women in Massachusetts
Statues in Boston